Ranger College is a public community college in Ranger, Texas. The college's website asserts that it "is one of the oldest public two-year colleges in continuous operation in the state of Texas." In conjunction with its main campus in Ranger, the college maintains several satellite campuses across Erath County and Brown County, Texas.  Ranger College provides dual-credit courses to over 40 area school districts.

As defined by the Texas State Legislature, the official service area of Ranger College is the part of the Ranger Independent School District located in Eastland County, excluding the area known as the "old Bullock School Land", and all of Brown, Comanche, Erath, and Young counties, excluding the portion of the Graham Independent School District located in Young County. Ranger College is a Hispanic Serving Institution.

History

The college opened as an extension of the local public school on September 13, 1926, with thirty students. The State Department of Education recognized the college on March 23, 1927. Ranger College was a governed by the public school system until August 18, 1950, when the Board of Education separated junior colleges. The college thereafter has been governed independently by a Board of Regents and its own presidents, of which Dr. G. C. Boswell was the first.

In 2010, Ranger College opened campuses in Early and Stephenville, Texas.

A 2011 proposal to close several rural Texas colleges was not adopted, and Ranger College continued to receive state funding.  Since then, student enrollment at Ranger College has increased by 33%:

In November 2016, the city of Ranger voted to approve a $10 million bond to provide new buildings and renovations across campus.  Construction began in the winter of 2017 and was completed in 2020.

Ranger College is accredited as a degree-granting institution by the Southern Association of Colleges and Schools.

Athletics

National Championships
 Women's Cross Country, 2020
 Rodeo, 2007
 Football, 1979
 Baseball, 1978 and 1973

Ranger College's athletic teams are nicknamed the Rangers. The Rangers compete in men's and women's basketball, baseball, softball, cross country running, golf, rodeo, soccer, and volleyball. The basketball teams play at Ron Butler Gymnasium. The baseball team plays at Ellis Burks Field, named after Ranger College alumnus and retired Major League Baseball player Ellis Burks.

In 1978 the Ranger College football team won the NJCAA national championship.

In June 2007, Ranger College won the National Intercollegiate Rodeo Association men's team title in the College National Finals Rodeo held in Casper, Wyoming. Ranger had only been competing again since 2005, after a 25-year hiatus.

In August 2007, Ranger replaced its football program with men's and women's soccer and men's golf programs. The football team finished the year with a record of 4 wins and 5 losses; the team was unable to compete its schedule due to ineligibility issues.

In 2013 the Ranger College men's soccer team won the NJCAA Region V Championship and participated in the NJCAA Division I national tournament.

In 2015-16 the men's basketball team was found to have committed two eligibility violations. The first instance caused them to forfeit four games. The second and more serious violation required them to forfeit all games from the 2015-2016 season  and to be placed on probation by the NJCAA for the 2016-17 season, meaning they were barred from any post-season play in 2016-17.

In June 2016, Ranger earned a College National Finals Rodeo championship when sophomore heeler Wesley Thorp won the team roping event, with partner Cole Weeler of Weatherford College.

In 2020, the Ranger College women's cross-country team won the NJCAA national title, and head cross-country coach Kathy Graham was named NJCAA National Coach of the Year.

Alumni

 Kris Clyburn, professional basketball player
 Billy Gillispie, NCAA basketball coach
 Agapius Masong, distance runner
 Jim Morris, professional baseball player and subject of the 2002 Disney film The Rookie.
 Johnny Perkins, professional football player
 Del Thompson, professional football player and member of Ranger College's 1978 national championship team

References

External links
Official website

 
Education in Eastland County, Texas
Educational institutions established in 1926
Universities and colleges accredited by the Southern Association of Colleges and Schools
Community colleges in Texas
Buildings and structures in Eastland County, Texas
NJCAA athletics
1926 establishments in Texas